Slaty Fork is an unincorporated community in Pocahontas County, West Virginia, United States.

A variant name was Laurel Bank.

A large cave known as Sharps Cave is located in Slaty Fork.

References

External links
Slatyfork

Unincorporated communities in Pocahontas County, West Virginia
Unincorporated communities in West Virginia